Opatov may refer to places in the Czech Republic:

Opatov (Prague Metro), a metro station in Prague
Opatov (Jihlava District), a municipality and village in the Vysočina Region
Opatov (Svitavy District), a municipality and village in the Pardubice Region
Opatov Photovoltaics Plant, a plant in the municipality
Opatov (Třebíč District), a market town in the Vysočina Region